"Wildcat Victory" is Kansas State University's official fight song.  It was written in 1927 by Harry E. Erickson, when the school was still known as Kansas State Agricultural College.  In addition to this song, the Kansas State University Marching Band also commonly plays "Wabash Cannonball" as an alternate fight song.  John Philip Sousa's "Kansas Wildcats March," written for the school, is Kansas State's official march.

On occasion, "Wildcat Victory" may be played for notable alumnus of Kansas State University by other bands.

Other uses
Lamar University's fight song, "Go Big Red," uses the same tune as "Wildcat Victory."  The tune is also used across the country by various high schools as their fight song.

References

External links

Kansas State Wildcats
American college songs
College fight songs in the United States
Big 12 Conference fight songs
1927 songs